The Play-offs of the 2004 Fed Cup Europe/Africa Zone Group I were the final stages of the Group I Zonal Competition involving teams from Europe and Africa. Those that qualified for this stage placed first and second in their respective pools, and also last in their pools.

The eight top teams were then randomly paired up the team from a different placing of another group for a play-off tie, with the winners being promoted to the World Group play-offs. The four bottom teams were also randomly paired up in play-off ties with the losers being relegated down to Group II for 2005.

Promotion play-offs

Serbia and Montenegro vs. Bulgaria

  advanced to the World Group play-offs, where they were drawn against . They lost 2–3, and thus were relegated back to Group I for next year.

Ukraine vs. Hungary

  advanced to the World Group play-offs, where they were drawn against . They lost 2–3, and thus were relegated back to Group I for next year.

Belarus vs. Sweden

  advanced to the World Group play-offs, where they were drawn against . They lost 0–4, and thus were relegated back to Group I for next year.

Estonia vs. Israel

  advanced to the World Group play-offs, where they were drawn against . They lost 2–3, and thus were relegated back to Group I for next year.

Relegation play-offs

Lithuania vs. Greece

  was relegated down to Group II for next year, where they placed fifth overall.

Denmark vs. South Africa

  was relegated down to Group II for next year.

See also
Fed Cup structure

References

External links
 Fed Cup website

2004 Fed Cup Europe/Africa Zone